Founded on March 19, 2014, the International Association of Accessibility Professionals (IAAP) is a nonprofit organization headquartered in Atlanta, Georgia, United States. The IAAP started with 38 international organizations from various global industries committed to being founding members. , IAAP had over 5,000 professional members and over 200 organizational members representing 130 different countries. IAAP became a division of the Global Initiative for Inclusive Information and Communication Technologies (G3ict) in July 2016.

Conference 
For the first time at the M-Enabling Summit, the International Association of Accessibility Professionals (IAAP) hosted a Pre-Conference Briefing Session to kick off the 2017 conference, IAAP expanded the Summit's reach by hosting technical and organizational training tracks for accessibility professionals throughout the conference.

References

External links 

Non-profit organizations based in Georgia (U.S. state)